Sphaeropteris lunulata is a species of tree fern in the family Cyatheaceae, native from Sulawesi in Malesia and the Bismarck Archipelago in Papuasia to the western Pacific. It was first described by Georg Forster in 1786 as Polypodium lunulatum and transferred to Sphaeropteris by Rolla Tryon in 1970.

References

lunulata
Flora of Malesia
Flora of Papuasia
Flora of the Southwestern Pacific
Flora of the Northwestern Pacific
Plants described in 1786